Silveiras is a municipality in São Paulo State, Brazil. It is part of the Metropolitan Region of Vale do Paraíba e Litoral Norte. The population is 6,339 (2020 est.) in an area of 414.78 km². The elevation is 615 m.

The municipality contains part of the  Mananciais do Rio Paraíba do Sul Environmental Protection Area, created in 1982 to protect the sources of the Paraíba do Sul river.

References

External links
  http://www.silveiras.sp.gov.br
  Silveiras on citybrazil.com.br
  Silveiras on Explorevale

Municipalities in São Paulo (state)